
There are fourteen species of carnivorous plants occurring in New Zealand, and four species that have been known to occur in the past.

Species

Drosera
Drosera arcturi
Drosera auriculata
Drosera binata
 Drosera capensis (introduced and fully naturalised plant pest)
Drosera peltata
Drosera pygmaea
Drosera spatulata
Drosera stenopetala (endemic)
Utricularia
Utricularia australis
Utricularia delicatula (endemic)
Utricularia dichotoma
Utricularia geminiscapa
Utricularia gibba (introduced plant pest)
Utricularia livida (introduced and fully naturalised plant pest)

Drosera burmanni, D. filiformis, U. arenaria and U. sandersonii have been known to occasionally occur.

Invasive species
Drosera capensis, U. arenaria, U. gibba, U. livida and U. sandersonii are listed on the National Pest Plant Accord since they are invasive species. The Cape sundew (D. capensis) and bladderwort (U. livida) have been found in the Auckland region and pose a threat to indigenous plants.

See also
 Carnivorous plants of Australia

References

Further reading

External links
New Zealand Carnivorous Plant Society